KLEA-FM (101.7 FM) was a radio station broadcasting an oldies music format. Licensed to Lovington, New Mexico, United States, the station was owned by Lea County Broadcasting Co.

KLEA-FM signed on in October 1965. The station shut down on June 30, 2017; on October 31, 2017, KLEA-FM ceased all remaining operations. The license was surrendered to the Federal Communications Commission (FCC), which cancelled it on November 9, 2017. The call letters are currently assigned to a station in Hobbs, New Mexico.

References

External links
 

Defunct radio stations in the United States
LEA-FM
Radio stations established in 1965
1965 establishments in New Mexico
Radio stations disestablished in 2017
2017 disestablishments in New Mexico
LEA